Francis James McCoy (February 26, 1881 – February 9, 1954) was an American football coach.  He served as the head football coach at the University of Maine from 1905 through 1908, compiling a record of 12–15–5.

McCoy was born in Holyoke, Massachusetts in 1881 to Owen and Annie (née Donahue) McCoy. He attended high school in Amherst, Massachusetts and also spent 1900 to 1901 at Amherst College, before attending Yale Law School, graduating in the class of 1904. He practiced law in Manhattan from 1905 until at least 1951. McCoy died on February 9, 1954, at White Plains Hospital in White Plains, New York.

Head coaching record

References

External links
 

1881 births
1954 deaths
20th-century American lawyers
Amherst Mammoths football players
Maine Black Bears football coaches
Yale Bulldogs football players
Yale Law School alumni
Lawyers from New York City
Politicians from Holyoke, Massachusetts
Sportspeople from Holyoke, Massachusetts
Coaches of American football from Massachusetts
Players of American football from Massachusetts